Events in the year 2004 in Cyprus.

Incumbents 

 President: Demetris Christofias
 President of the Parliament: Yiannakis Omirou

Events 
Ongoing – Cyprus dispute
 1 May - Cyprus joins European Union.
 14 November – Researchers claim to have found a site that may be a candidate for the lost city of Atlantis on the bottom of the east Mediterranean, 80 kilometers southeast of Cyprus. The Cypriot government disputes the claim, saying more evidence is needed.
 17 December – The E.U. states that Turkey must recognize the ethnic-Greek government of the country before it can begin negotiations for E.U. membership. Currently Turkey is the only country that recognizes the Turkish Republic of Northern Cyprus.

Deaths

References 

 
2000s in Cyprus
Years of the 21st century in Cyprus
Cyprus
Cyprus
Cyprus